{{Infobox person
| name = Brandon Wardell
| image = 
| imagesize =
| caption =
| birth_date = 
| birth_name = Brandon Sean Wardell
| birth_place =  High Point, North CarolinaU.S.
| occupation = Actor, producer, musician
| years_active = 2004–present
| notable_works =Johnny Dollar onCatch Me If You Can (musical)| othername = Brandon Sean Wardell
| spouse = 
| children = 1
}}

Brandon Wardell (born March 25, 1975 in High Point, North Carolina) is an American actor, producer, musician. He is currently touring the U.S. with Under the Streetlamp, a doo-wop quartet, alongside former cast members of the Tony Award-winning musical Jersey Boys.

Brandon was previously a producer of the critically acclaimed haunted play Delusion: The Blood Rite with Neil Patrick Harris, his wife Sarah Glendening, and Hollywood stuntman Jon Braver.

Wardell last appeared on Broadway as Agent Johnny Dollar in  Catch Me If You Can at the Neil Simon Theatre. He is also currently working as a producer on the feature film Shift with his company Johnny Roscoe Productions. Brandon has been nominated for four Grammy Awards and four Tony Awards for his work as a Producer.

Career
Brandon Wardell is a 5-time Tony Award and 4-time Grammy Award nominee and member of the Recording Academy who is equally at home in the spotlight or behind the scenes in film, on TV, on stage, in the studio or in concert. Brandon has Performed, Produced and Recorded all over the world at a wide variety of venues and events including: The Hollywood Bowl, The Merle Watson Festival, Radio City Music Hall, Stephen Sondheim’s Birthday Celebration at Avery Fisher Hall with the New York Philharmonic, The Whisky a Go Go, The Bratislava Symphony Orchestra, The Kennedy Center and Times Square New Year's Eve Celebration.

Brandon lives in South Carolina with his daughter and wife, actress and producer, Sarah Glendening and divides his time between touring Nationwide performing with Under The Streetlamp; Producing Theatre, Film, TV and Music projects; and developing a multitude of projects as an Actor, Musician, Producer, and Engineer.

Brandon is a film, theatre and album Producer with his company, Johnny Roscoe Productions, in addition to his acting and singing career. His Broadway Producing credits include: Catch Me If You Can, Evita (with Ricky Martin), The Best Man (starring, James Earl Jones and Angela Lansbury), On a Clear Day You Can See Forever (starring Harry Connick, Jr.) and How to Succeed in Business Without Really Trying which opened with Daniel Radcliffe and John Larroquette in the leading roles.

Brandon is additionally a music Producer and musician. His former band, Brando's Island, was based in Los Angeles where he made his home after spending most of his career living in New York City. Brandon has Produced and/or performed in films, on albums or onstage with a diverse group of artists including: Carol Burnett, Wayne Brady, Roger Rees, Neil Patrick Harris, Denis O'Hare, Nicole Scherzinger, Tom Wopat, Vanessa Hudgens, Daniel Radcliffe, Mario Cantone, John Larroquette, Kathy Lee Gifford, Harry Connick Jr., Sutton Foster, Matthew Morrison, Christian Borle, Richard Kind, Christopher Walken, Sally Struthers, Aaron Tveit, Ricky Martin, Angela Lansbury, James Earl Jones, Michael McKean, Eric McCormack, Candice Bergen and Brooke Shields.

Wardell has appeared in productions of  Catch Me If You Can,  Rent, Evil Dead The Musical (Outer Critics Circle Award nomination), Assassins, Good Vibrations, Thoroughly Modern Millie and James Joyce's The Dead.

His film and television credits include The Devil You Know, Punk'd, Circle of Fury, The Turing Love Affair, The Rooster (Slamdance Film Festival), the 2005 Times Square New Year's Eve Celebration, where he sang live for over a million people, and multiple appearances on The View, All My Children (as Julian), and Guiding Light (guest star).

Album Production credits include:  cast album of the 2011 revival of How to Succeed in Business Without Really Trying, starring Daniel Radcliffe. Other credits include Fela!,  Annie: 30th Anniversary Cast Recording, Evil Dead: The Musical and Paul Scott Goodman's Rooms.

His Grammy nominated albums include:  How to Succeed,  Fela!,  Ain't Misbehavin', and The Revival of Gypsy'', starring Patti LuPone.

References

External links

Johnny Roscoe Productions website
Theatreland Productions website

Living people
1975 births
American male stage actors
American theatre managers and producers
People from High Point, North Carolina